Ken Andrus (born July 14, 1935) is an American rancher and Republican who served as a member of the Idaho House of Representatives from 2004 to 2016, representing the 28A and 29A districts. Andrus' son, Kevin Andrus, succeeded his father in the legislature.

Early life and education
Andrus was born in Marion, Utah. He earned a Bachelor of Science degree in animal husbandry from Brigham Young University.

Elections
Ken Andrus retired after the 2016 Idaho House of Representatives session.

District 28

2014 
Andrus was unopposed for the Republican primary. He defeated Kurtis R. Workman with 64.4% of the vote.

2012 
Redistricted to 28A, Andrus was unopposed for the Republican primary. He defeated Sam McKee with 62.7% of the vote.

District 29

2010 
Andrus ran unopposed for the Republican primary. He defeated James ("Jim") W. Allen in the general election with 61.% of the vote.

2008 
Andrus was unopposed for the Republican primary. Andrus won the general election with 11,044 votes (56.2%) against Allen R. Andersen.

2006 
Unopposed for, Republican primary. Andrus won the November 7, 2006, general election with 7,404 votes (51.41%) against Allen R. Andersen.

2004 
Andrus was unopposed for the Republican primary. He won the general election with 9,504 votes (51.9%) against Democratic Representative Allen R. Andersen.

References

External links
 https://web.archive.org/web/20160305122132/http://kenandrus.com/

1935 births
Living people
Brigham Young University alumni
Republican Party members of the Idaho House of Representatives
People from Bannock County, Idaho
People from Summit County, Utah
United States Army soldiers
21st-century American politicians